Tor, TOR or ToR may refer to:

Places
 Tor, Pallars, a village in Spain
 Tor, former name of Sloviansk, Ukraine, a city
 Mount Tor, Tasmania, Australia, an extinct volcano
 Tor Bay, Devon, England
 Tor River, Western New Guinea, Indonesia

Science and technology
 Tor (fish), a genus of fish commonly known as mahseers
 Target of rapamycin, a regulatory enzyme
 Tor functor, in mathematics
 Tor (network), an Internet communication method for enabling online anonymity
 The Tor Project, a software organization that maintains the Tor network and the related Tor Browser

People
 Tor (given name), a Nordic masculine given name
 Tor (surname)
 Tor Johnson, stage name of Swedish professional wrestler and actor Karl Erik Tore Johansson (1902 or 1903–1971)
 Tor (musician), Canadian electronic musician Tor Sjogren

Arts, entertainment, and media

Fictional characters
 Tor (comics), a prehistoric human character
 Tor, a character in the book The Hero and the Crown
 Tor, a character in the animated television series Moby Dick and Mighty Mightor
 Sir Tor, one of the Knights of the Round Table

In print
 Tor, 1944 Dutch novel by Gerard Walschap
 Tor.com, an online science fiction and fantasy magazine

Other arts, entertainment, and media
 The One Ring Roleplaying Game ("TOR"), a tabletop role-playing game set in J.R.R. Tolkien's Middle-earth
 TheOneRing.net, a fandom website for Middle-earth-related topics

Companies
 Tor Air, a former Swedish charter airline
 Tor Books, a publishing company
 Tor Line, a former Swedish shipping company

Military
 HNoMS Tor, several Norwegian Navy craft
 Tor (rifle), a Polish sniper rifle
 Tor missile system, a Russian anti-aircraft weapon

Other uses
 Tor (rock formation), a rock outcrop or hill
 Tor, Toowoomba, a heritage listed villa at Queensland, Australia
 Tor (research station), a Norwegian research station in Antarctica
 Tor, a subdivision of the Orya–Tor languages of Western New Guinea, Indonesia
 TOR, IATA airport code and FAA location identifier of Torrington Municipal Airport, Wyoming, US
 Transport of Rockland, a bus system in Rockland County, New York, US
 Terms of reference, define the purpose and structure of a collection of people with a common goal
 T.O.R., nominal letters added after their name by a member of the Third Order Regular of Saint Francis of Penance, a mendicant religious order
 Tornado warning, a weather alert whose SAME code is TOR
 Transcript of Records, an inventory of the courses taken and grades earned of a student

See also

 
 Tor Castle, Highland, Scotland
 Tor Formation, a geological formation of the North Sea
 Tor Limestone, a geologic formation in Nevada
 El Tor, a strain of bacteria
 El Tor, Egypt, a city
 El Tor Airport
 Tor-tor dance, a traditional Indonesian dance
 Thor (disambiguation)
 Torr (disambiguation)
 Torre (disambiguation)
 Tors (disambiguation)